Nicole Lapierre is a French sociologist, anthropologist and writer. She is the emeritus director of research at CNRS. She published her first book, La Femme majeure in 1973, in collaboration with Edgar Morin and Bernard Paillard. Her later books include Le Silence de la mémoire (1989), Changer de nom (1995), La famille providence (1997), Le Nouvel Esprit de famille (2001), Pensons ailleurs (2004) and Causes communes (2011). She is a winner of the Prix Medicis.

References

21st-century French writers
Living people
Year of birth missing (living people)
Prix Médicis essai winners
Research directors of the French National Centre for Scientific Research